Amara confusa is a species of beetle of the genus Amara in the family Carabidae.

References

confusa
Beetles described in 1848
Taxa named by John Lawrence LeConte